The 3rd constituency of the Ardennes is a French legislative constituency in the Ardennes département.  It is currently represented by Jean-Luc Warsmann of the centre-right.

Description

It is located in the south east third of the Department, around the town of Sedan.

Deputies

Election results

2022

 
 
 
 
 
|-
| colspan="8" bgcolor="#E9E9E9"|
|-

2017

2012

2007

2002

 
 
 
 
 
|-
| colspan="8" bgcolor="#E9E9E9"|
|-

1997

 
 
 
 
 
 
 
 
|-
| colspan="8" bgcolor="#E9E9E9"|
|-

Sources

 French Interior Ministry results website: 

3